IMFT may refer to:

 IM Flash Technologies, a semiconductor company founded in 2006, by Intel Corporation and Micron Technology, Inc.
 Institut de Mécanique des Fluides de Toulouse, a joint research laboratory founded in 1920, specializing the physics of flows.